The 2022 Major League Baseball All-Star Game was the 92nd Major League Baseball All-Star Game, held between the American League (AL) and the National League (NL) of Major League Baseball (MLB). The game was hosted by the Los Angeles Dodgers at Dodger Stadium. The game was played on July 19, broadcast nationally by Fox television and ESPN Radio.

The American League defeated the National League 3–2, for its ninth straight All-Star Game win.

Background

Host selection 
The Dodgers were awarded the 2022 MLB All-Star Game after the 2020 contest, which they were originally scheduled to host, was canceled due to the COVID-19 pandemic in the United States. This marked the first time in 42 years (and fourth time overall) that the Dodgers hosted an All-Star Game, the previous occurrences being in 1949 at Ebbets Field in Brooklyn (when the franchise played as the Brooklyn Dodgers), 1959 at Los Angeles Memorial Coliseum, and 1980 at Dodger Stadium.

Roster selections 
The starting rosters for each league's position players plus designated hitter (DH) were determined by fan balloting, which was conducted in two phases. New in 2022, the first-phase top vote-getter for each league automatically received a spot in the starting lineup. The top two vote-getters for every other non-pitching position and DH advanced to the second phase of voting. There are normally six finalists for the three outfield positions in each league, except when an outfielder is the top vote-getter, in which case there are four finalists for the remaining two outfield positions. Voting does not carry over between phases.

First phase voting was held from June 8 through June 30, and second phase voting was held from July 5 through July 8. All voting was conducted online, at MLB.com or via the MLB app. Starting players, as selected via voting, were announced on July 8. Reserve position players and all pitchers—selected "via 'Player Ballot' choices and selections made by the Commissioner’s Office"—were announced on July 10. The final roster size of each team was planned to be 32 players.

All-Star legacy selections 
MLB announced on July 8 that Albert Pujols and Miguel Cabrera had been added as the 33rd player for the NL and AL, respectively, in celebration of their career achievements.  This was the 11th All-Star selection for Pujols and the 12th for Cabrera.

Logo and uniforms 
The 2022 All-Star Game logo was shaped after the hexagonal DodgerVision video boards at Dodger Stadium, with gold-trimmed Art Deco lettering as a nod to Hollywood. This was originally unveiled as the logo for the canceled 2020 All-Star Game, but was ultimately recycled for the 2022 game. Uniforms for the American League were in dark gray, while uniforms for the National League were in white. Team logos and letters were in gold with black trim. Caps were black featuring each team's logo in gold and black embellishments, along with a gold star.

Rosters

American League

National League

 Denotes top vote-getter in each league
 Denotes player was an All-Star legacy selection.

Roster notes

J.D. Martinez was named as the roster replacement for Yordan Alvarez due to injury.
Carlos Rodón was named as the roster replacement for Josh Hader due to Hader dealing with a personal matter.
William Contreras was named starter in place of Bryce Harper due to injury.
<li>Garrett Cooper was named as the roster replacement for Bryce Harper due to injury.
Corey Seager was named as the roster replacement for George Springer due to injury.
Austin Riley was named as the roster replacement for Nolan Arenado due to injury 
Andrés Giménez was named starter in place of José Altuve due to injury.
<li>Santiago Espinal was named as the roster replacement for José Altuve due to injury.
<li>Tyler Anderson was named as the roster replacement for Carlos Rodón due to injury.
Jeff McNeil was named starter in place of Jazz Chisholm Jr. due to injury
<li>Jake Cronenworth was named as the roster replacement for Jazz Chisholm Jr. due to injury
Liam Hendriks was named as the roster replacement for Justin Verlander due to Verlander starting on Saturday
<li>Jordan Romano was named as the roster replacement for Gerrit Cole due to Cole starting on Sunday
<li>Devin Williams was named as the roster replacement for Max Fried due to Fried starting on Saturday
Byron Buxton was named starter in place of Mike Trout due to injury
<li>Ty France was named as the roster replacement for Mike Trout due to injury
<li>Miles Mikolas was named as the roster replacement for Corbin Burnes due to Burnes opting not to play
<li>Freddie Freeman was named as the roster replacement for Starling Marte due to injury
#: Indicates player would not play (replaced as per reference notes above).

Game summary

Starting lineup

Line score

National anthems
The Canadian national anthem was sung in English and French by actress and singer Melissa O'Neil, accompanied by organist Dieter Ruehle. The American national anthem was sung by singer-songwriter and actor Ben Platt.

See also
List of Major League Baseball All-Star Games
Major League Baseball All-Star Game Most Valuable Player Award
All-Star Futures Game
Home Run Derby

References

External links

Major League Baseball All-Star Game
All-Star
Baseball competitions in Los Angeles
Major League Baseball All-Star Game
21st century in Los Angeles
Major League Baseball All-Star Game
Major League Baseball All-Star Game